3122 Florence is a stony trinary asteroid of the Amor group. It is classified as a near-Earth object and potentially hazardous asteroid. It measures approximately 5 kilometers in diameter. It orbits the Sun at a distance of 1.0–2.5 AU once every 2 years and 4 months (859 days); the orbit has an eccentricity of 0.42 and an inclination of 22° with respect to the ecliptic. Florence has two moons.

Florence was discovered on 2 March 1981 by American astronomer Schelte J. "Bobby" Bus at Siding Spring Observatory. It was named in honor of Florence Nightingale, the founder of modern nursing; the naming citation was published on 6 April 1993.

Florence is classified as a potentially hazardous object because its minimum orbit intersection distance  indicates that it has the potential to make close approaches to the Earth, and because measurements of its absolute magnitude  suggest that it is large enough to create serious damage were it to impact.

Moons 

Radar observations during the 2017 flyby have shown that Florence has two moons. The inner of the two moons is estimated to have a diameter of 180 to 240 meters, the outer moon is between 300 and 360 meters across. Each moon is somewhat elongated, and both are tidally locked to the main body. They probably formed as loose material spun away from the main body as its rotation accelerated due to the YORP effect.

The inner moon's period orbiting Florence appears to be approximately 7 hours, while the outer moon completes a revolution in about 21 to 23 hours. The inner moon of Florence has the shortest orbital period of any of the moons of the 60 near-Earth asteroids known to have moons.

2017 close approach 
  from Earth, approximately eighteen times the average distance of the Moon. As seen from Earth, it brightened to apparent magnitude 8.5, and was visible in small telescopes for several nights as it moved south to north through the constellations Piscis Austrinus, Capricornus, Aquarius, and Delphinus. This was the asteroid's closest approach since 1890 and the closest until after 2500. Its previous flyby was on 29 August 1930, at a distance of 0.05239 AU and the next one will be on 2 September 2057, at 0.049952 AU.

Radar imagery 

During the flyby, scientists studied Florence using the Arecibo Observatory and the Goldstone Deep Space Communications Complex, and discovered that it has two moons.

 Goldstone Radar

 Arecibo Radar

Notes

References

External links
 
 (3122) Florence, Asteroids with Satellites Database—Johnston's Archive
 Asteroid Florence found to have 2 moons, Eddie Irizarry, 2 September 2017
 Lightcurve plot, Brian D. Warner, Center for Solar System Studies, Spring 2016
 Asteroid Lightcurve Database (LCDB), query form (info )
 Dictionary of Minor Planet Names, Google books
 Asteroids and comets rotation curves, CdR – Observatoire de Genève, Raoul Behrend
 
 
 

003122
Discoveries by Schelte J. Bus
Named minor planets
003122
3122 Florence
003122
003122
Near-Earth objects in 2017
19810302